A lead single (also known as a debut single) is the first single to be released from a studio album by an artist or a band, usually before the album itself is released and also occasionally on the same day of the album's release date.

Release strategies

Artists often choose songs that are more up-tempo, yet representative of the album's sound, as lead singles.  Such songs are often catchier and attract the attention of listeners. The subsequent single might then be slower in tempo, in order to demonstrate the range of the album. Female vocalists like Mariah Carey and Christina Aguilera often maintain a formula of an up-tempo first lead single with a slow ballad follow-up. For example, two singles were released by Miley Cyrus before her album Bangerz – an up-tempo track called, "We Can't Stop" was released as the first, and a slow-ballad song, "Wrecking Ball" as the second. This was a successful practice of 1980s heavy metal bands. Girls Aloud chose to use "The Show", a dance-pop and electropop song, as their lead single for their second album, What Will the Neighbours Say?, following the fact that their previous singles from their debut album Sound of the Underground were "quite down and moody" according to band member Cheryl. However, not all artists decide to choose their lead single with the up-tempo criteria. Artists may release a lead single that has a message they want to convey to listeners instead of a song with more commercial potential, such as Fall Out Boy who chose to release "This Ain't a Scene, It's an Arms Race" over the radio-friendly "Thnks fr th Mmrs".

Japanese artists such as Ayumi Hamasaki, Namie Amuro and B'z may release four to eight singles before their albums to achieve record-breaking debut-week sales. The lead singles in Japan are very heavily advertised and promoted, in some cases even more than the album itself. With album sales continuously declining in the United States, record labels often release singles before the album's release date to online music retailers including iTunes, ranging in price from $0.99 to $1.29. This trend has become increasingly popular in many markets.

In the late 2010s, artists began a trend of releasing multiple singles before eventually releasing a studio album. An unnamed A&R representative confirmed to Rolling Stone in 2018 that "an artist has
to build a foundation to sustain" and adding that "When artists have one big record and go run with that, it doesn't work because they never had a foundation to begin with." The same article cited examples such as Cardi B, Camila Cabello and Jason Derulo releasing four or more singles before their album releases.

Albums with more than one pre-release single

In the 2000s, a common trend developed to release a lead single months in advance of the album release date. It has equally become common for further singles to be released before the release of the album. For example, Usher issued the lead single "Love in This Club" four months before the May 29, 2008, release of Here I Stand. The second single "Love in This Club Part II" was released one month before the album release date. Another example is Justin Timberlake's 2013 album, The 20/20 Experience, which was released on March 19, 2013. The first single off it is "Suit & Tie", released 2 months before the album hit stores. One month before the release of the album, another single called "Mirrors" was released. Katy Perry released "California Gurls" as a single on May 7, 2010, and "Teenage Dream" on July 23, 2010, leading to the release of the album Teenage Dream on August 24, 2010. Ed Sheeran did something similar, releasing both "Shape of You" and "Castle on the Hill" as double lead singles from his album ÷, although these songs were both released on the same day, 6 January 2017.

References

Single types
Music industry